Julius Peter Heil (July 24, 1876November 30, 1949) was an American politician and the 30th Governor of Wisconsin from 1939 to 1943.

Early life
Heil, a Jewish immigrant to the United States, was born in Düssmund an der Mosel, Germany. As a child, he lived with his family on a farm in New Berlin, Wisconsin, and attended school until he was twelve.

Career
Heil became qualified as an expert welder and traveled extensively in South America, installing welded steel track for streetcars. In 1901, he founded the Heil Company in Milwaukee, which fabricated steel tank cars. In 1933, he was appointed by President Franklin Roosevelt to head the state advisory board for the National Recovery Administration.

Winning the Republican gubernatorial nomination in 1938, Heil went on to defeat his Progressive opponent-incumbent Philip F. La Follette. As governor, he created the Department of Motor Vehicles out of five existing agencies and consolidated welfare and institutional programs under a single Department of Public Welfare. A controversial innovation was his creation of a Division of Departmental Research, designed to achieve greater efficiency in state administration. The United States entered World War II during Heil's second term, and a State Guard was created to replace the National Guard, which had been called to active duty. Often known as "Julius the Just," as governor, the New York Times reported that Heil was known for clowning and silly antics. He was re-elected in 1940, but lost to Progressive Orland Steen Loomis in 1942, according to the New York Times, because of his unpopular labor record.

After losing a third term as governor, Heil became president and later chairman of the board of the Heil Company. He toured the country to promote Wisconsin's dairy products.

Death
Heil died of heart failure in Milwaukee on November 30, 1949, (age 73 years, 129 days). He is interred at Wisconsin Memorial Park, Brookfield, Wisconsin.

Family life
Son of Frank and Barbara Heil, he married Elizabeth Conrad on June 4, 1900, and they had one son, Joseph F. Heil.

Election results
1940 Wisconsin Republican gubernatorial primary results: Julius Heil, 223,819; James K. Robinson 106,570
1940 Wisconsin gubernatorial results:  Julius Heil (R) defeated F.E. McGovern (D) and Orland S. Loomis
1942 Wisconsin gubernatorial results:  Orland Loomis (Progressive) (R) defeated Julius Heil (R) and Dr. W. C. Sullivan

See also
List of U.S. state governors born outside the United States

References

External links
 

1876 births
1949 deaths
Businesspeople from Wisconsin
Politicians from Milwaukee
Republican Party governors of Wisconsin
Jewish American people in Wisconsin politics
Jewish American state governors of the United States
19th-century German Jews
Emigrants from the German Empire to the United States
Burials in Wisconsin
People from New Berlin, Wisconsin